Nûr-Mêr, also  Niwâr-Mêr ( ni-wa-ar-me-er, c. 2153-2148 BCE) was a ruler of the city of Mari, one of the military governors known as Shakkanakku in northern Mesopotamia, in the later period of the Akkadian Empire. According to the dynastic lists, he ruled for 5 years, after  his father Ishma-Dagan, and was the fourth Shakkanakku ruler. Nûr-Mêr was probably contemporary with the Akkadian Empire ruler Naram-Sin or Shar-Kali-Sharri. He was succeeded by his brother Ishtup-Ilum as Shakkanakkus of Mari.

He is also known from four identical inscriptions on bronze votive tablets:

The goddess in mention might had been the Syrian Shalash, the wife of Dagan, rather than Mesopotamian Ninhursag, as her name was commonly written logographically as dNIN.HUR.SAG.GA in Mari in the Old Babylonian period.

References

22nd-century BC rulers
Kings of Mari
22nd-century BC people